Inúbia Paulista is a municipality in the state of São Paulo in Brazil.

References

Municipalities in São Paulo (state)